Tregorrick is a hamlet south of St Austell in mid Cornwall, England, United Kingdom.

The hamlet was part of the Penrice estate and today consists of some 52 dwellings and has a population of approximately 65 people.

There is some evidence of tin smelting at the bottom of the village near the river and Pentewan road.  Several of the houses in the hamlet are constructed in cob and are some 300 years old.  There are some 15 houses which were built in the 1960s.  The village is dissected by a series of footpaths and narrow lanes.

There are no shops, church or pub in the village; however, there is a strong tradition of self-reliance, barter and community action.

References

Hamlets in Cornwall